Microtis oblonga, commonly known as the sweet onion orchid, is a species of orchid endemic to south-eastern Australia. It has a single hollow, onion-like leaf and up to fifty scented, bright green flowers. It is considered by some Australian authorities to be synonymous with Microtis rara.

Description
There is a raised, dark green callus in the centre of the labellum. Flowering occurs from October to February.

Taxonomy and naming
Microtis oblonga was first formally described in 1923 by Richard Sanders Rogers and the description was published in Transactions and Proceedings of the Royal Society of South Australia. It is regarded by many Australian authorities as being a synonym of Microtis rara. The specific epithet (oblonga) is a Latin word meaning "longer than broad".

Distribution and habitat
The sweet onion orchid grows between grasses and shrubs in open forest from Gympie in Queensland south through New South Wales, Victoria and Tasmania and west to south-eastern South Australia.

References

External links
 
 

oblonga
Endemic orchids of Australia
Orchids of New South Wales
Orchids of Queensland
Orchids of South Australia
Orchids of Tasmania
Orchids of Victoria (Australia)
Plants described in 1923